Genetic assignment methods are a set of powerful statistical methods that are used to determine the relationship between individuals and populations. The general principle behind them is to use multilocus genotypes to assign reference populations as origins of individuals.

Genetic assignment methods

Frequency method
This method is first presented by Paetkau et al. in 1995. It assigns an individual to the reference population based on the likelihood of that individual's genotype in the population. This method assumes Hardy–Weinberg equilibrium and independence of loci, as well as an unstated assumption that is the deduced population sample allelic frequencies are close to the exact values.
This method includes three steps:

 Computing the required allelic frequencies in all candidate populations
 Computing the likelihoods of the individual's multilocus genotype occurring in each population
 Assigning the individual to the population in which the likelihood of the individual's genotype is the highest

Bayesian model
This method is inspired by Rannala and Mountain. In their paper published in 1997, a Bayesian approach was used to detect immigration. Assuming each locus’ allelic frequencies in each population have an equal prior probability, the marginal probability of observing an individual with genotype  at locus j in population i is equal to

 

nijk is the number of alleles k sampled at locus j in population i, nij is the number of gene copies sampled at locus j in population i, and kj is the total number of alleles observed in the whole populations at locus j.

Distance method
This method is presented by Cornuet et al. in 1999.  It uses genetic distance to assign the individual to the “closest” population. For the interpopulation distances, the individual is assigned as a sample of two alleles; for the shared allele distance, the distance was taken as the average of distances between the individual and the population samples. Note this method  does not assume Hardy–Weinberg equilibrium or independence of loci.

References 

Statistical methods